Coat of Many Colors is the eighth solo studio album by American singer-songwriter Dolly Parton. It was released on October 4, 1971, by RCA Victor. The album was nominated for Album of the Year at the 1972 CMA Awards. It also appeared on Time magazine's list of the 100 Greatest Albums of All Time and at No. 257 on Rolling Stone 2020 list of the 500 Greatest Albums of All Time. Parton has cited the title track on numerous occasions as her personal favorite of all the songs she has written.

The album was reissued on cassette in Canada in 1985. It was reissued on CD for the first time in 1999. It was reissued on CD in Europe in 2001 with 1971's Joshua. The album was reissued on CD again in 2007 featuring four previously unreleased tracks. In 2010, Sony Music reissued the 2007 CD in a triple-feature set with 1973's My Tennessee Mountain Home and 1974's Jolene.

Content

The album's title track, "Coat of Many Colors", tells of how Parton's mother stitched together a coat for her daughter out of rags given to the family. As she sewed, she told her child the biblical story of Joseph and his coat of many colors. The excited child, "with patches on my britches and holes in both my shoes", rushed to school, "just to find the others laughing and making fun of me" for wearing a coat made of rags. "Traveling Man" involves an unusual love triangle between a traveling salesman, a woman, and her mother. Parton wrote all the songs, except for three tracks written by Porter Wagoner. Parton came to prominence as a featured performer on Wagoner's television variety show from 1967-74 and they often collaborated on each other's recordings during this era. 

Over the years, Parton would re-record a number of songs from the album. "Traveling Man" was re-recorded in 1973 for Parton's Bubbling Over album. "My Blue Tears" was re-recorded in 1978 with Emmylou Harris and Linda Ronstadt for a trio album project. The recording would eventually surface on Ronstadt's 1982 album Get Closer. Parton also cut the song for a third time, including it on her 2001 album, Little Sparrow. Parton re-recorded "Early Morning Breeze" for 1974's Jolene and again for inclusion as a bonus track on the Walmart edition of her 2014 album, Blue Smoke. The bonus track "My Heart Started Breaking" was later re-recorded and included on Parton's 1975 album, Dolly. Parton re-recorded "Here I Am" as a duet with Sia for the 2018 soundtrack album, Dumplin'.

Critical reception

The review published in the October 16, 1971, issue of Billboard said, "The top stylist's new single, the touching ballad 'Coat of Many Colors', kicks off what should prove to be her biggest selling album to date. Most of the material is her own, with a few strong numbers penned by Porter Wagoner. The recent hit single, 'My Blue Tears', is spotlighted along with other standouts such as 'She Never Met a Man' and 'The Way I See You'."

Cashbox published a review in the October 9, 1971, issue, which said, "It's hard to believe it's possible, but Dolly's releases still get better and better each time you listen and each time a new one hits the market. This one's another bulleye–with her new single as the title track and her previous hit 'My Blue Tears' for drawing power, an extraordinary self-penned tune (even for Dolly) in 'She Never Met a Man (She Didn't Like)' for programming appeal and a trio of Porter Wagoner tunes to put the icing on the country cake. Bound for top chart honors."

Robert Christgau's review in his 1981 book, Christgau's Record Guide: Rock Albums of the Seventies, said, "Beginning with two absolutely classic songs, one about a mother's love and the next about a mother's sexuality, and including country music's answers to 'Triad' ('If I Lose My Mind') and 'The Celebration of the Lizard' ('The Mystery of the Mystery'), side one is genius of a purity you never encounter in rock anymore. Overdisc [the B-side] is mere talent, except 'She Never Met a Man (She Didn't Like),' which is more."

In 2007, John Metzger, reviewing for The Music Box, said that the album "firmly remains the artistic pinnacle of her career" because it is "brave, bold, and emotionally pure".

Writing for AllMusic, Stephen Thomas Erlewine gave the album five stars and said that the album "announced Parton as a major talent in her own right, not merely a duet partner".

Commercial performance
The album peaked at No. 7 on the US Billboard Hot Country LP's chart.

The album's first single, "My Blue Tears", was released in June 1971 and peaked at No. 17 on the US Billboard Hot Country Singles chart and No. 4 in Canada on the RPM Country Singles chart. The second single, "Coat of Many Colors", was released in September 1971 and peaked at No. 4 on the US Billboard Hot Country Singles chart and No. 15 in Canada on the RPM Country Singles chart. It peaked at No. 60 in Australia.

Accolades
The album was nominated for Album of the Year at the 1972 Country Music Association Awards.

In 2006, the album appeared on Time magazine's list of the 100 Greatest Albums of All Time. In 2003 the album was ranked number 299 on Rolling Stone list of the 500 Greatest Albums of All Time, with the ranking dropping to number 301 in the 2012 update and climbing to number 257 in the 2020 reboot of the list. In 2017, National Public Radio ranked the album No. 11 on their list of the 150 greatest albums made by women.

Recording
Recording sessions for the album took place at RCA Studio B in Nashville, Tennessee, on April 16 and 27, 1971. Three tracks on the album were recording during sessions for previous albums. "She Never Met a Man (She Didn't Like)" and "A Better Place to Live" were recorded during the October 30, 1969, session for 1970's The Fairest of Them All and "Early Morning Breeze" was recorded during the January 26, 1971, session for 1971's Joshua.

Track listing

Personnel
Adapted from the album liner notes and RCA recording session records.

David Briggs – piano
Jerry Carrigan – drums
Pete Drake – steel
Bobby Dyson – bass
Bob Ferguson – producer
Johnny Gimble – fiddle
Dave Kirby – guitar
Les Leverett – photograph of cover painting
Mack Magaha – fiddle
George McCormick – guitar
The Nashville Edition – background vocals
Al Pachucki – recording engineer
Dolly Parton – lead vocals, liner notes
Hargus Robbins – piano
Billy Sanford – guitar
Roy Shockley – recording technician
Jerry Shook – guitar
Buddy Spicher – fiddle
Buck Trent – electric banjo

Charts
Album

Album (Year-End)

Singles

Certifications

Release history

References

1971 albums
Dolly Parton albums
RCA Records albums
Albums produced by Bob Ferguson (music)